The black-line rasbora or slender rasbora (Rasbora daniconius) (called darka at Rangpur), is a species of ray-finned fish in the genus cyprinid family. It is found in rivers of South and Southeast Asia, ranging from Sri Lanka and the Indus basin to northern the Malay Peninsula and the Mekong.

The body is oblong and compressed. The greatest width of the head equals its post-orbital length. It reaches  in length.

References 

Rasboras
Fish of Bangladesh
Fish of Thailand
Fish described in 1822
Taxa named by Francis Buchanan-Hamilton